Autumn Withers (born October 16, 1979) is an American actress, singer and former dancer with the Radio City Rockettes.

Early life and education
Autumn was born in Supply, North Carolina. She attended dance classes from an early age, in the Cecchetti method of ballet. She later studied dance and acting at the North Carolina School of the Arts and went on to attend the University of Georgia, where she would graduate summa cum laude with a degree in journalism.

Personal life
Autumn lives in Los Angeles. In her spare time, she is an avid photographer and Georgia Bulldogs supporter. She also meditates daily. On October 19, 2014, she married her husband, actor Gideon Emery at Santa Barbara, California. In 2017, Withers and her husband revealed that they were expecting their first child together. On April 7, 2018, they welcomed their daughter, Mia Monroe Emery.

Career
Autumn's first professional acting credit came during her childhood. While still in the Carolinas, she landed a small role in the dance movie, Shag, starring Bridget Fonda and Phoebe Cates. After university, Autumn moved to New York to pursue her dance career. She worked on several off-Broadway productions, before landing a role in Broadway show Yo Alice, from creator Maurice Hines. After a few years, she decided to head to Los Angeles to pursue an acting career. While there, the famed Radio City Rockettes were holding auditions for their company. On a whim, she auditioned, and ended up being cast. Given the choice between staying in New York or touring with the show, she opted for the latter, as it would offer a chance to fulfill not only her love for dance, but another passion: travel. For four years, Autumn danced with the Rockettes across the US, as well as Canada but then fate intervened. She was injured during a show, requiring arthroscopic hip surgery, effectively ending her professional dance career.

Returning to Los Angeles to recover, Autumn would focus on her acting, specifically in comedy. She studied improv comedy at both iO West and at The Groundlings. One of her first film roles would be as a dancer in The Curious Case of Benjamin Button. Other notable on-camera roles include Mrs Ebbert in Modern Family, Jean in the Sundance film festival favorite Catherine alongside Jenny Slate, and multiple roles in sketch comedy news parody series E&N with Ed Neusbit. More recently, Autumn starred in, and co-produced, the dark comedy feature, Avalanche, alongside husband Gideon Emery.

Autumn is also a writer. Together with her writing partner, Ryann Ferguson, they have penned a number of television pilots, from comedy to drama, which center around strong female characters. They are currently actively pitching their shows to studios in Hollywood.

Other works
Autumn is also a country/folk singer-songwriter. In 2011, together with fellow composer and guitarist, Jeff Marshall, she released the album No Romeo under the name Autumn Lee. She followed that up with her second album, Angel Made of Steel, as well as the single, Invisible.

Aside from performing, Autumn has a passion for helping empower other women. In 2015 she founded the Hollywood Women's Collective, a "women's community dedicated to supporting women creatives and engendering a spirit of support, collaboration, and giving back."

During the 2017 US presidential election, Autumn lent her voice in support of her former fellow Radio City Rockettes dancers. At the time, Trump's derogatory comments about women in the leaked  Access Hollywood tape were a hot topic and the Rockettes were said to be being pressured to perform at the inauguration event under threat of financial penalty or firing, despite several being upset at what would be a tantamount endorsement of Trump's treatment of women. Despite Trump's more recent questioning of the tape's veracity, Billy Bush, then host of Access Hollywood, declared that it was indeed genuine.

Filmography

Film

Television

Web

Stage

Discography
No Romeo (2011)
Angel Made of Steel (2012)
Invisible (2012)

References

External links
 
 Autumn Withers on iTunes

1979 births
Living people
American film actresses
American female dancers
American women singer-songwriters
American television actresses
American women screenwriters
The Rockettes
University of Georgia alumni
20th-century American actresses
20th-century American singers
20th-century American women singers
21st-century American actresses
21st-century American singers
21st-century American women singers
American singer-songwriters